George T. Walker (February 5,  1915 – August 19, 1967) was an American Negro league pitcher in the 1930s and 1940s.

A native of Waco, Texas, Walker made his Negro leagues debut with the Homestead Grays in 1937. He went on to play for the Kansas City Monarchs through 1943, then played minor league baseball for the Tucson Cowboys in 1952 and the Tyler East Texans in 1953. Walker died in Waco in 1967 at age 52.

References

External links
 and Seamheads

1915 births
1967 deaths
Homestead Grays players
Kansas City Monarchs players
Baseball pitchers
Baseball players from Texas
Sportspeople from Waco, Texas
20th-century African-American sportspeople